The Battle of Rio Nuevo took place between 25 and 27 June 1658 on the island of Jamaica between Spanish forces under Cristóbal Arnaldo Isasi and English forces under governor Edward D'Oyley. In the battle lasting over two days the invading Spanish were routed.  It is the largest battle to be fought on Jamaica.

Background
In 1655, an English force led by Admiral Sir William Penn, and General Robert Venables seized the island, and successfully held it against two Spanish attempts to retake it. The former Spanish governor of Jamaica, Don Cristóbal Arnaldo Isasi, attempted to recapture the island with forces from Cuba in mid-1657, but the attack was repulsed at the Battle of Ocho Rios by acting governor Colonel Edward D'Oyley.

On 20 May 1658, Isasi attempted another invasion with more men recruited from New Spain; the Tercios Mexicano (Mexican Regiment). Isasi also had at his disposal four troop transports and armed ships. In total, the invasion force consisted of 31 captains, 31 ensigns, 28 sergeants and 467 soldiers. While this force anchored for two days near the mouth of Rio Nuevo, three English coast guard vessels chanced upon the Spanish but were chased away by gunfire. The English scouts reported back to D'Oyley, who mustered all available militia and soldiers who were fit to fight. The Spanish in the meantime fortified their camp and were joined by around 50 tattered Spanish guerrillas.

Battle
On 25 June, D'Oyley mustered a total of 700 soldiers and militia and ten ships to transport them. The English troops disembarked near the Rio Nuevo. The English then captured the Spanish transports, sealing off any escape for the invaders. The Spanish, seeing this, attempted to make a stand behind their newly fortified redoubt. The English declined to come to grips and fired on the Spanish position with cannon and muskets for two days. Their superior firepower had a devastating effect, and when the surviving Spanish attempted to break out,  most were killed or captured. What was left of the invasion force fled into the hills and jungle. They had lost over 300 dead and wounded, mostly killed, and 150 prisoners, as well as eleven flags, six guns, and most of their arms and ammunition. English casualties numbered around sixty. Most of the wounded on both sides died of tropical diseases.

Aftermath
The victorious English conveyed the Spanish artillery back to 'The Point' and to Fort Cromwell, installing it into their defences. Isasi tried to keep up the struggle until he was defeated in 1660, escaping from what is now the area of the Tower Isle resort and fleeing to Cuba by canoe with his remaining supporters. To dissuade further Spanish attempts to retake Jamaica, the English under Christopher Myngs launched attacks on Spanish ports such as Santa Marta and Tolu, forcing the Spanish to the defensive.

The battle of Rio Nuevo was the last Spanish attempt to recapture Jamaica. Spain ceded the island to England in 1670 under the Treaty of Madrid.

Battlefield today
The Rio Nuevo Battle Site Heritage Park and Museum was opened in August 2009.

See also
 History of Jamaica
 British military history
 Spanish Empire

Notes

References
 V Black, Clinton. The Story of Jamaica from Prehistory to the Present. Collins, London, 1965.
 Marley, David. Wars of the Americas: A Chronology of Armed Conflict in the New World, 1492 to the Present. ABC-Clio, 1998.
 Morales Padrón, Francisco. Spanish Jamaica. Kingston: Ian Randle Publishers, 1953, (2003).

External links
 British Civil Wars, Commonwealth and Protectorate website – The Anglo-Spanish War 1655–1660 
 Opening of the Battle of Rio Nuevo battle site
 Plaque commemorating the site of the Battle of Rio Nuevo

Conflicts in 1658
Rio Nuevo
Rio Nuevo
Rio Nuevo
1658 in the Colony of Santiago
1658 in Jamaica
1658 in the British Empire
1658 in the Caribbean
Anglo-Spanish War (1654–1660)